Paul Phelan (born 27 June 1966) is an Irish former hurler who played as a left corner-back for the Kilkenny senior team.

Born in Ballyhale, County Kilkenny, Phelan first arrived on the inter-county scene at the age of seventeen when he first linked up with the Kilkenny minor team. He made his senior debut during the 1989-90 league. Phelan remained on the panel for a number of years and won one National Hurling League medal.

At club level Phelan is a one-time All-Ireland medallist with Ballyhale Shamrocks. In addition to this he has also won one Leinster medal and four championship medals.

Throughout his career Phelan made just 2 championship appearances. He retired from inter-county hurling following the conclusion of the 1993 championship.

Honours

Player

Ballyhale Shamrocks
All-Ireland Senior Club Hurling Championship (1): 1990
Leinster Senior Club Hurling Championship (1): 1989
Kilkenny Senior Club Hurling Championship (4): 1985, 1988, 1989, 1991

Kilkenny
All-Ireland Senior Hurling Championship (2): 1992 (sub), 1993 (sub)
Leinster Senior Hurling Championship (2): 1992 (sub), 1993 (sub)
National Hurling League (1): 1989-90
Leinster Minor Hurling Championship (1): 1984

References

1966 births
Living people
Hurling backs
Ballyhale Shamrocks hurlers
Kilkenny inter-county hurlers